The Reading Company Grain Elevator was built as a grain elevator in 1925 by the Reading Railroad in Center City Philadelphia to replace an elevator that had operated on the same spot since the Civil War.  The building was abandoned in the 1950s and refitted in the 1970, with the lower floor made into offices, the grain storage areas essentially untouched, and the upper levels made into penthouses.

See also

 List of grain elevators

References

Agricultural buildings and structures on the National Register of Historic Places in Pennsylvania
Industrial buildings completed in 1925
Residential buildings in Philadelphia
Grain elevators in the United States
Reading Company
Agricultural buildings and structures in Pennsylvania
National Register of Historic Places in Philadelphia